Civil Defenders, also known as Defenders Basketball, is a Nigerian professional basketball club from Abuja. The club competes in the Nigerian Premier League.

The Defenders competed in the FIBA Africa Basketball League in 2018–19.

In African competitions
FIBA Africa Basketball League  (1 appearances)
2018–19 – Quarterfinals

References

Basketball teams in Nigeria